The Democratic Coalition of Namibia (DCN) was a political party in Namibia.

History
The DCN was founded in 1994 as the successor of the Namibia Patriotic Front (NPF) which already had a seat in Parliament. Several members of the Democratic Turnhalle Alliance and the Action Christian National also joined the new party.

Election results

The DCN contested the 1994 Namibian general election. After winning only one seat the party's sole representative in the National Assembly became party leader Moses Katjiuongua. The party did not contest the 2004 Namibian general election and was deregistered in 2009.

See also

List of political parties in Namibia

References

Defunct political parties in Namibia
Political parties disestablished in 2009
Political parties established in 1994
1994 establishments in Namibia